The Oregon State Police (OSP) is a law enforcement agency of the U.S. state of Oregon.  The OSP enforces all of Oregon's criminal laws and assists local law enforcement agencies. Terri Davie has served as Superintendent since November 1, 2020.
The agency differs from other state police highway patrol agencies in that OSP has many other areas of specialization and responsibility. In addition to the Patrol Division, OSP has a Criminal Division (detectives, arson, explosives), SWAT, DPU (Dignitary Protection Unit), MRT (Mobile Response Team), a Forensic Services Division (crime labs), a Fish and Wildlife Division (game wardens), a Medical Examiner's Division, an Oregon State Fire Marshal Division, and it is one of the few law enforcement agencies in the United States that monitors the security of the state lottery.
Oregon State Police has primary jurisdiction on state highways and all other state owned property, including state prisons and other facilities. It also frequently responds to incidents in rural areas when local agencies lack capacity or otherwise require assistance.

History
The Oregon State Police began operating on August 1, 1931.  The organization was designed by a committee appointed by Governor Julius L. Meier, who made a survey of some of the most successful state law enforcement agencies across North America, including the Royal Canadian Mounted Police, the New Jersey State Police, the Texas Rangers, the Pennsylvania State Police, and others.  They took on the responsibilities that were previously handled by the State Highway Commission, the Fish and Game Commission, the Secretary of State, the Prohibition Commissioner, and the State Fire Marshal.  OSP's first Superintendent (head) was Charles Pray, State Parole Officer and a former Department of Justice Agent.  Mr. Pray set up four OSP districts in the state and thirty-one patrol stations.  He began his duties on June 7, 1931, about two months before the State Police began operating.

Harold Maison, formerly with the State Traffic Division, was appointed Chief Clerk and was stationed at General Headquarters in Salem.  He was charged with setting up and maintaining a system of reports and records for the OSP.

Captain George Alexander was placed in charge of the Bureau of Identification and Investigation and charged with the investigational activities of the department. On January 1, 1932, he was appointed Deputy Superintendent, a served a position he held until his installment as Warden of the State Penitentiary in 1938.

Charles McClees, previously with the State Game Commission, was appointed captain and placed in charge of game and commercial fish enforcement.

Chain Of Command

Services

Criminal Investigation Division
This division's primary duty is to assist other law enforcement agencies throughout the state of Oregon with Criminal Justice Investigations. Within the Criminal Investigation Division there are sub-divisions, those are Major Crimes Section; Drug Enforcement Section;  Arson/Explosives Section; and Investigative Reports Section. Members of the Criminal Division participate on teams with more than 40 local, county, and federal agencies.

Fish and Wildlife
The Fish and Wildlife division primarily enforces laws and ordinances protecting Oregon wildlife and natural resources, though the Fish and Wildlife troopers also enforce traffic code and all other Oregon criminal laws.

Recent changes
In 1993, the Oregon Legislature approved legislation that included the previously autonomous organizations of the Oregon State Fire Marshal's Office, Law Enforcement Data System, Oregon Emergency Management, and the Oregon Boxing and Wrestling Commission within the Department of State Police.

As of late 2018 the agency has been transitioning to the Smith & Wesson M&P 2.0 9MM to replace their current Smith & Wesson M&P .40 S&W sidearms.

See also

 Highway patrol
 List of law enforcement agencies in Oregon
 State patrol
 State police

References

External links
Oregon State Police (official website)

State Police
Government agencies established in 1931
1931 establishments in Oregon